Allen Hiram Atwater was a member of the Wisconsin State Assembly.

Biography
Atwater was born in Riga, New York, reports have differed on the exact date. In 1842, he married Eliza A. Parmelee. They would have nine children.

Career
Atwater was a member of the Assembly during the 1854, 1871 and 1872 sessions. In 1856 and 1858, he was elected County Treasurer of Dodge County, Wisconsin. Other positions Atwater held include justice of the peace. Initially a Whig, he later became a Republican.

References

People from Monroe County, New York
People from Dodge County, Wisconsin
County treasurers in Wisconsin
American justices of the peace
Wisconsin Whigs
19th-century American politicians
Year of death missing
Republican Party members of the Wisconsin State Assembly